Smørstabben Nunatak is an isolated nunatak lying  west of the Eckhörner Peaks in the Humboldt Mountains of Queen Maud Land. It was discovered and photographed by the German Antarctic Expedition of 1938-39 and mapped by Norway from air photos and surveys by the Norwegian Antarctic Expedition of 1956–60. It was named Smørstabben ("the churnstaff").

References

Nunataks of Queen Maud Land
Humboldt Mountains (Antarctica)